Sergey Nikolayevich Artyomov (born 1 January 1978) is a retired Russian professional footballer. He made his debut in the Russian Premier League in 1996 for FC Dynamo Moscow.

Honours
 Russian Premier League bronze: 1997.
 Russian Third League Zone 3 top scorer: 1996.

European competitions
 UEFA Cup 1996–97 with FC Dynamo Moscow: 2 games, 2 goals.
 UEFA Intertoto Cup 1997 with FC Dynamo Moscow: 1 game.

External links
  Profile at Footballfacts

1978 births
Footballers from Moscow
Living people
Russian footballers
FC Dynamo Moscow players
Russian Premier League players
Association football forwards
FC Chertanovo Moscow players